The People's Liberation Army Navy Coastal Defense Force is one of five branches of the People's Liberation Army Navy. The Coastal Defence Force is a land-based fighting force with a strength of 25,000 personnel, they serve to defend China's coastal areas from invasion via amphibious landings or air-attack. Throughout the 1960s to 1980s, the Coastal Defense Force was focused on defending China's coast from a possible Soviet sea-borne invasion. With the fall of the Soviet Union, the threat of an amphibious invasion of China has diminished and therefore the branch is often considered to no-longer be a vital component of the PLAN. Especially as the surface warships of the PLAN continue to improve in terms of anti-ship and air-defence capabilities.

Today the primary weapons of the coastal defense troops are the HY-2, YJ-82, the land-based version of the YJ-12 the YJ-12B, C-602 and YJ-18 road-mobile anti-ship missiles.

References

See also 

 People's Liberation Army Navy
 People's Liberation Army Naval Air Force
 People's Liberation Army Navy Marine Corps
 China Coast Guard

3